Mountain Home School District may refer to:

 Mountain Home School District (Arkansas), based in Mountain Home, Arkansas
 Mountain Home School District (Idaho), based in Mountain Home, Idaho